An inverse number may refer to:

The multiplicative inverse of a number
A type of grammatical number